The 1939 VFL season was the 43rd season of the Victorian Football League (VFL), the highest level senior Australian rules football competition in Victoria. The season featured twelve clubs, ran from 22 April until 30 September, and comprised an 18-game home-and-away season followed by a finals series featuring the top four clubs.

The premiership was won by the Melbourne Football Club for the third time, after it defeated  by 53 points in the 1939 VFL Grand Final.

Premiership season
In 1939, the VFL competition consisted of twelve teams of 18 on-the-field players each, plus one substitute player, known as the 19th man. A player could be substituted for any reason; however, once substituted, a player could not return to the field of play under any circumstances.

Teams played each other in a home-and-away season of 18 rounds; matches 12 to 18 were the "home-and-way reverse" of matches 1 to 7.

Once the 18 round home-and-away season had finished, the 1939 VFL Premiers were determined by the specific format and conventions of the Page–McIntyre system.

Round 1

|- bgcolor="#CCCCFF"
| Home team
| Home team score
| Away team
| Away team score
| Venue
| Crowd
| Date
|- bgcolor="#FFFFFF"
| 
| 11.18 (84)
| 
| 17.19 (121)
| MCG
| 21,840
| 22 April 1939
|- bgcolor="#FFFFFF"
| 
| 18.14 (122)
| 
| 14.7 (91)
| Victoria Park
| 17,500
| 22 April 1939
|- bgcolor="#FFFFFF"
| 
| 20.22 (142)
| 
| 13.10 (88)
| Princes Park
| 25,000
| 22 April 1939
|- bgcolor="#FFFFFF"
| 
| 18.20 (128)
| 
| 9.13 (67)
| Junction Oval
| 15,500
| 22 April 1939
|- bgcolor="#FFFFFF"
| 
| 11.9 (75)
| 
| 9.12 (66)
| Arden Street Oval
| 14,000
| 22 April 1939
|- bgcolor="#FFFFFF"
| 
| 14.18 (102)
| 
| 15.17 (107)
| Western Oval
| 23,000
| 22 April 1939

Round 2

|- bgcolor="#CCCCFF"
| Home team
| Home team score
| Away team
| Away team score
| Venue
| Crowd
| Date
|- bgcolor="#FFFFFF"
| 
| 17.13 (115)
| 
| 11.11 (77)
| Glenferrie Oval
| 11,000
| 29 April 1939
|- bgcolor="#FFFFFF"
| 
| 14.18 (102)
| 
| 20.14 (134)
| Brunswick Street Oval
| 15,000
| 29 April 1939
|- bgcolor="#FFFFFF"
| 
| 19.21 (135)
| 
| 21.15 (141)
| Windy Hill
| 20,000
| 29 April 1939
|- bgcolor="#FFFFFF"
| 
| 20.19 (139)
| 
| 17.8 (110)
| Punt Road Oval
| 26,000
| 29 April 1939
|- bgcolor="#FFFFFF"
| 
| 15.17 (107)
| 
| 21.20 (146)
| Lake Oval
| 17,000
| 29 April 1939
|- bgcolor="#FFFFFF"
| 
| 14.8 (92)
| 
| 11.13 (79)
| Corio Oval
| 15,000
| 29 April 1939

Round 3

|- bgcolor="#CCCCFF"
| Home team
| Home team score
| Away team
| Away team score
| Venue
| Crowd
| Date
|- bgcolor="#FFFFFF"
| 
| 16.16 (112)
| 
| 10.21 (81)
| MCG
| 25,703
| 6 May 1939
|- bgcolor="#FFFFFF"
| 
| 16.8 (104)
| 
| 15.16 (106)
| Windy Hill
| 21,000
| 6 May 1939
|- bgcolor="#FFFFFF"
| 
| 17.11 (113)
| 
| 14.14 (98)
| Victoria Park
| 20,000
| 6 May 1939
|- bgcolor="#FFFFFF"
| 
| 17.21 (123)
| 
| 16.10 (106)
| Princes Park
| 18,000
| 6 May 1939
|- bgcolor="#FFFFFF"
| 
| 17.14 (116)
| 
| 8.18 (66)
| Glenferrie Oval
| 12,000
| 6 May 1939
|- bgcolor="#FFFFFF"
| 
| 9.14 (68)
| 
| 10.17 (77)
| Lake Oval
| 15,000
| 6 May 1939

Round 4

|- bgcolor="#CCCCFF"
| Home team
| Home team score
| Away team
| Away team score
| Venue
| Crowd
| Date
|- bgcolor="#FFFFFF"
| 
| 14.24 (108)
| 
| 13.7 (85)
| Punt Road Oval
| 15,000
| 13 May 1939
|- bgcolor="#FFFFFF"
| 
| 10.17 (77)
| 
| 11.11 (77)
| Brunswick Street Oval
| 12,000
| 13 May 1939
|- bgcolor="#FFFFFF"
| 
| 11.8 (74)
| 
| 15.20 (110)
| Arden Street Oval
| 10,500
| 13 May 1939
|- bgcolor="#FFFFFF"
| 
| 19.15 (129)
| 
| 11.15 (81)
| Corio Oval
| 11,000
| 13 May 1939
|- bgcolor="#FFFFFF"
| 
| 20.11 (131)
| 
| 13.16 (94)
| Junction Oval
| 28,000
| 13 May 1939
|- bgcolor="#FFFFFF"
| 
| 5.12 (42)
| 
| 14.16 (100)
| Western Oval
| 23,000
| 13 May 1939

Round 5

|- bgcolor="#CCCCFF"
| Home team
| Home team score
| Away team
| Away team score
| Venue
| Crowd
| Date
|- bgcolor="#FFFFFF"
| 
| 12.18 (90)
| 
| 15.16 (106)
| Corio Oval
| 12,000
| 20 May 1939
|- bgcolor="#FFFFFF"
| 
| 14.21 (105)
| 
| 8.18 (66)
| Windy Hill
| 18,000
| 20 May 1939
|- bgcolor="#FFFFFF"
| 
| 16.22 (118)
| 
| 13.11 (89)
| Punt Road Oval
| 11,000
| 20 May 1939
|- bgcolor="#FFFFFF"
| 
| 18.12 (120)
| 
| 16.6 (102)
| Lake Oval
| 14,000
| 20 May 1939
|- bgcolor="#FFFFFF"
| 
| 11.13 (79)
| 
| 17.14 (116)
| Brunswick Street Oval
| 15,000
| 20 May 1939
|- bgcolor="#FFFFFF"
| 
| 13.8 (86)
| 
| 11.17 (83)
| Glenferrie Oval
| 20,000
| 20 May 1939

Round 6

|- bgcolor="#CCCCFF"
| Home team
| Home team score
| Away team
| Away team score
| Venue
| Crowd
| Date
|- bgcolor="#FFFFFF"
| 
| 19.23 (137)
| 
| 3.12 (30)
| MCG
| 16,523
| 27 May 1939
|- bgcolor="#FFFFFF"
| 
| 14.14 (98)
| 
| 12.7 (79)
| Victoria Park
| 15,000
| 27 May 1939
|- bgcolor="#FFFFFF"
| 
| 8.13 (61)
| 
| 9.14 (68)
| Princes Park
| 34,000
| 27 May 1939
|- bgcolor="#FFFFFF"
| 
| 16.18 (114)
| 
| 10.16 (76)
| Junction Oval
| 17,000
| 27 May 1939
|- bgcolor="#FFFFFF"
| 
| 11.13 (79)
| 
| 15.10 (100)
| Western Oval
| 13,000
| 27 May 1939
|- bgcolor="#FFFFFF"
| 
| 15.11 (101)
| 
| 13.10 (88)
| Arden Street Oval
| 14,500
| 27 May 1939

Round 7

|- bgcolor="#CCCCFF"
| Home team
| Home team score
| Away team
| Away team score
| Venue
| Crowd
| Date
|- bgcolor="#FFFFFF"
| 
| 17.13 (115)
| 
| 14.13 (97)
| Corio Oval
| 8,000
| 3 June 1939
|- bgcolor="#FFFFFF"
| 
| 14.15 (99)
| 
| 18.14 (122)
| Brunswick Street Oval
| 11,000
| 3 June 1939
|- bgcolor="#FFFFFF"
| 
| 8.14 (62)
| 
| 13.17 (95)
| Lake Oval
| 15,000
| 3 June 1939
|- bgcolor="#FFFFFF"
| 
| 12.15 (87)
| 
| 7.23 (65)
| Glenferrie Oval
| 12,500
| 3 June 1939
|- bgcolor="#FFFFFF"
| 
| 6.17 (53)
| 
| 12.17 (89)
| Punt Road Oval
| 40,000
| 3 June 1939
|- bgcolor="#FFFFFF"
| 
| 10.12 (72)
| 
| 10.18 (78)
| Windy Hill
| 20,000
| 3 June 1939

Round 8

|- bgcolor="#CCCCFF"
| Home team
| Home team score
| Away team
| Away team score
| Venue
| Crowd
| Date
|- bgcolor="#FFFFFF"
| 
| 7.13 (55)
| 
| 12.21 (93)
| Glenferrie Oval
| 21,000
| 10 June 1939
|- bgcolor="#FFFFFF"
| 
| 18.12 (120)
| 
| 16.10 (106)
| Junction Oval
| 17,000
| 10 June 1939
|- bgcolor="#FFFFFF"
| 
| 18.15 (123)
| 
| 12.12 (84)
| Victoria Park
| 36,000
| 10 June 1939
|- bgcolor="#FFFFFF"
| 
| 9.16 (70)
| 
| 13.13 (91)
| Windy Hill
| 18,000
| 12 June 1939
|- bgcolor="#FFFFFF"
| 
| 18.14 (122)
| 
| 15.13 (103)
| MCG
| 22,016
| 12 June 1939
|- bgcolor="#FFFFFF"
| 
| 21.17 (143)
| 
| 14.12 (96)
| Corio Oval
| 9,000
| 12 June 1939

Round 9

|- bgcolor="#CCCCFF"
| Home team
| Home team score
| Away team
| Away team score
| Venue
| Crowd
| Date
|- bgcolor="#FFFFFF"
| 
| 12.14 (86)
| 
| 19.16 (130)
| Western Oval
| 13,500
| 17 June 1939
|- bgcolor="#FFFFFF"
| 
| 19.19 (133)
| 
| 15.13 (103)
| Princes Park
| 20,000
| 17 June 1939
|- bgcolor="#FFFFFF"
| 
| 15.18 (108)
| 
| 12.14 (86)
| Lake Oval
| 9,000
| 17 June 1939
|- bgcolor="#FFFFFF"
| 
| 12.22 (94)
| 
| 9.15 (69)
| Punt Road Oval
| 17,000
| 17 June 1939
|- bgcolor="#FFFFFF"
| 
| 11.15 (81)
| 
| 13.12 (90)
| Brunswick Street Oval
| 10,000
| 17 June 1939
|- bgcolor="#FFFFFF"
| 
| 10.18 (78)
| 
| 14.21 (105)
| Arden Street Oval
| 14,000
| 17 June 1939

Round 10

|- bgcolor="#CCCCFF"
| Home team
| Home team score
| Away team
| Away team score
| Venue
| Crowd
| Date
|- bgcolor="#FFFFFF"
| 
| 16.15 (111)
| 
| 7.14 (56)
| Corio Oval
| 6,500
| 24 June 1939
|- bgcolor="#FFFFFF"
| 
| 17.13 (115)
| 
| 10.13 (73)
| Brunswick Street Oval
| 11,000
| 24 June 1939
|- bgcolor="#FFFFFF"
| 
| 19.11 (125)
| 
| 16.19 (115)
| Windy Hill
| 11,000
| 24 June 1939
|- bgcolor="#FFFFFF"
| 
| 15.12 (102)
| 
| 11.10 (76)
| Arden Street Oval
| 11,000
| 24 June 1939
|- bgcolor="#FFFFFF"
| 
| 22.22 (154)
| 
| 8.12 (60)
| MCG
| 26,063
| 24 June 1939
|- bgcolor="#FFFFFF"
| 
| 14.14 (98)
| 
| 9.16 (70)
| Junction Oval
| 28,000
| 24 June 1939

Round 11

|- bgcolor="#CCCCFF"
| Home team
| Home team score
| Away team
| Away team score
| Venue
| Crowd
| Date
|- bgcolor="#FFFFFF"
| 
| 7.9 (51)
| 
| 9.12 (66)
| Punt Road Oval
| 17,000
| 1 July 1939
|- bgcolor="#FFFFFF"
| 
| 8.4 (52)
| 
| 7.12 (54)
| Glenferrie Oval
| 8,000
| 1 July 1939
|- bgcolor="#FFFFFF"
| 
| 5.10 (40)
| 
| 3.7 (25)
| Western Oval
| 6,000
| 1 July 1939
|- bgcolor="#FFFFFF"
| 
| 18.9 (117)
| 
| 7.18 (60)
| Victoria Park
| 10,500
| 1 July 1939
|- bgcolor="#FFFFFF"
| 
| 15.13 (103)
| 
| 7.18 (60)
| Princes Park
| 11,000
| 1 July 1939
|- bgcolor="#FFFFFF"
| 
| 7.6 (48)
| 
| 14.12 (96)
| Lake Oval
| 6,000
| 1 July 1939

Round 12

|- bgcolor="#CCCCFF"
| Home team
| Home team score
| Away team
| Away team score
| Venue
| Crowd
| Date
|- bgcolor="#FFFFFF"
| 
| 11.18 (84)
| 
| 15.17 (107)
| Glenferrie Oval
| 18,000
| 8 July 1939
|- bgcolor="#FFFFFF"
| 
| 10.20 (80)
| 
| 9.16 (70)
| Brunswick Street Oval
| 12,000
| 8 July 1939
|- bgcolor="#FFFFFF"
| 
| 17.20 (122)
| 
| 18.15 (123)
| Windy Hill
| 13,000
| 8 July 1939
|- bgcolor="#FFFFFF"
| 
| 13.21 (99)
| 
| 15.16 (106)
| Punt Road Oval
| 22,000
| 8 July 1939
|- bgcolor="#FFFFFF"
| 
| 18.12 (120)
| 
| 16.13 (109)
| Corio Oval
| 10,500
| 8 July 1939
|- bgcolor="#FFFFFF"
| 
| 12.16 (88)
| 
| 16.17 (113)
| Lake Oval
| 14,000
| 8 July 1939

Round 13

|- bgcolor="#CCCCFF"
| Home team
| Home team score
| Away team
| Away team score
| Venue
| Crowd
| Date
|- bgcolor="#FFFFFF"
| 
| 7.7 (49)
| 
| 13.25 (103)
| Western Oval
| 15,000
| 15 July 1939
|- bgcolor="#FFFFFF"
| 
| 19.11 (125)
| 
| 8.13 (61)
| Victoria Park
| 10,500
| 15 July 1939
|- bgcolor="#FFFFFF"
| 
| 14.14 (98)
| 
| 12.5 (77)
| Princes Park
| 19,000
| 15 July 1939
|- bgcolor="#FFFFFF"
| 
| 18.11 (119)
| 
| 11.16 (82)
| Arden Street Oval
| 8,000
| 15 July 1939
|- bgcolor="#FFFFFF"
| 
| 16.19 (115)
| 
| 13.6 (84)
| Junction Oval
| 16,500
| 15 July 1939
|- bgcolor="#FFFFFF"
| 
| 7.18 (60)
| 
| 10.17 (77)
| MCG
| 16,247
| 15 July 1939

Round 14

|- bgcolor="#CCCCFF"
| Home team
| Home team score
| Away team
| Away team score
| Venue
| Crowd
| Date
|- bgcolor="#FFFFFF"
| 
| 15.22 (112)
| 
| 13.12 (90)
| Corio Oval
| 5,000
| 22 July 1939
|- bgcolor="#FFFFFF"
| 
| 15.19 (109)
| 
| 9.9 (63)
| Brunswick Street Oval
| 10,000
| 22 July 1939
|- bgcolor="#FFFFFF"
| 
| 10.18 (78)
| 
| 15.12 (102)
| Junction Oval
| 28,000
| 22 July 1939
|- bgcolor="#FFFFFF"
| 
| 18.14 (122)
| 
| 10.8 (68)
| Punt Road Oval
| 17,000
| 22 July 1939
|- bgcolor="#FFFFFF"
| 
| 9.14 (68)
| 
| 13.7 (85)
| Western Oval
| 11,000
| 22 July 1939
|- bgcolor="#FFFFFF"
| 
| 10.13 (73)
| 
| 11.13 (79)
| Arden Street Oval
| 16,500
| 22 July 1939

Round 15

|- bgcolor="#CCCCFF"
| Home team
| Home team score
| Away team
| Away team score
| Venue
| Crowd
| Date
|- bgcolor="#FFFFFF"
| 
| 14.18 (102)
| 
| 9.6 (60)
| MCG
| 12,882
| 5 August 1939
|- bgcolor="#FFFFFF"
| 
| 15.17 (107)
| 
| 6.11 (47)
| Windy Hill
| 8,000
| 5 August 1939
|- bgcolor="#FFFFFF"
| 
| 18.8 (116)
| 
| 13.11 (89)
| Victoria Park
| 19,000
| 5 August 1939
|- bgcolor="#FFFFFF"
| 
| 24.15 (159)
| 
| 9.17 (71)
| Princes Park
| 12,000
| 5 August 1939
|- bgcolor="#FFFFFF"
| 
| 12.6 (78)
| 
| 18.15 (123)
| Lake Oval
| 10,000
| 5 August 1939
|- bgcolor="#FFFFFF"
| 
| 10.20 (80)
| 
| 12.7 (79)
| Glenferrie Oval
| 6,000
| 5 August 1939

Round 16

|- bgcolor="#CCCCFF"
| Home team
| Home team score
| Away team
| Away team score
| Venue
| Crowd
| Date
|- bgcolor="#FFFFFF"
| 
| 15.11 (101)
| 
| 18.8 (116)
| Arden Street Oval
| 14,000
| 12 August 1939
|- bgcolor="#FFFFFF"
| 
| 19.15 (129)
| 
| 12.10 (82)
| Western Oval
| 7,500
| 12 August 1939
|- bgcolor="#FFFFFF"
| 
| 16.8 (104)
| 
| 10.13 (73)
| Victoria Park
| 14,000
| 12 August 1939
|- bgcolor="#FFFFFF"
| 
| 18.16 (124)
| 
| 7.20 (62)
| Princes Park
| 11,000
| 12 August 1939
|- bgcolor="#FFFFFF"
| 
| 22.16 (148)
| 
| 13.17 (95)
| MCG
| 9,413
| 12 August 1939
|- bgcolor="#FFFFFF"
| 
| 13.13 (91)
| 
| 18.14 (122)
| Junction Oval
| 17,000
| 12 August 1939

Round 17

|- bgcolor="#CCCCFF"
| Home team
| Home team score
| Away team
| Away team score
| Venue
| Crowd
| Date
|- bgcolor="#FFFFFF"
| 
| 7.17 (59)
| 
| 12.12 (84)
| Corio Oval
| 6,500
| 19 August 1939
|- bgcolor="#FFFFFF"
| 
| 10.10 (70)
| 
| 10.8 (68)
| Brunswick Street Oval
| 9,000
| 19 August 1939
|- bgcolor="#FFFFFF"
| 
| 14.17 (101)
| 
| 9.7 (61)
| Windy Hill
| 10,000
| 19 August 1939
|- bgcolor="#FFFFFF"
| 
| 11.14 (80)
| 
| 12.12 (84)
| Lake Oval
| 5,000
| 19 August 1939
|- bgcolor="#FFFFFF"
| 
| 6.15 (51)
| 
| 7.17 (59)
| Glenferrie Oval
| 7,500
| 19 August 1939
|- bgcolor="#FFFFFF"
| 
| 13.10 (88)
| 
| 6.13 (49)
| Punt Road Oval
| 40,000
| 19 August 1939

Round 18

|- bgcolor="#CCCCFF"
| Home team
| Home team score
| Away team
| Away team score
| Venue
| Crowd
| Date
|- bgcolor="#FFFFFF"
| 
| 11.13 (79)
| 
| 6.16 (52)
| Junction Oval
| 12,000
| 2 September 1939
|- bgcolor="#FFFFFF"
| 
| 11.17 (83)
| 
| 6.7 (43)
| Western Oval
| 3,500
| 2 September 1939
|- bgcolor="#FFFFFF"
| 
| 13.13 (91)
| 
| 8.11 (59)
| Victoria Park
| 28,000
| 2 September 1939
|- bgcolor="#FFFFFF"
| 
| 16.22 (118)
| 
| 8.14 (62)
| Princes Park
| 10,000
| 2 September 1939
|- bgcolor="#FFFFFF"
| 
| 11.10 (76)
| 
| 9.11 (65)
| Arden Street Oval
| 3,500
| 2 September 1939
|- bgcolor="#FFFFFF"
| 
| 11.15 (81)
| 
| 4.11 (35)
| MCG
| 9,043
| 2 September 1939

Ladder

Finals

Semi finals

|- bgcolor="#CCCCFF"
| Home team
| Score
| Away team
| Score
| Venue
| Crowd
| Date
|- bgcolor="#FFFFFF"
| 
| 6.6 (42)
| 
| 10.12 (72)
| MCG
| 51,411
| 9 September
|- bgcolor="#FFFFFF"
| 
| 15.14 (104)
| 
| 12.18 (90)
| MCG
| 54,776
| 16 September

Preliminary Final

|- bgcolor="#CCCCFF"
| Home team
| Score
| Away team
| Score
| Venue
| Crowd
| Date
|- bgcolor="#FFFFFF"
| 
| 20.14 (134)
| 
| 15.15 (105)
| MCG
| 66,848
| 23 September

Grand final

Melbourne defeated Collingwood 21.22 (148) to 14.11 (95), in front of a crowd of 78,110 people. (For an explanation of scoring see Australian rules football).

Awards
 The 1939 VFL Premiership team was Melbourne.
 The VFL's leading goalkicker was Ron Todd of Collingwood with 98 goals (121 after finals).
 The Argus newspaper's "Player of the Year", was shared between Jack Dyer of Richmond and Dick Reynolds of Essendon.
 The winner of the 1939 Brownlow Medal was Marcus Whelan of Collingwood with 23 votes.
 South Melbourne took the "wooden spoon" in 1939.
Melbourne 22.12 (144) defeated  17.13 (115) in the Grand Final, played as a stand-alone game on Thursday 28 September (Show Day holiday) at the Melbourne Cricket Ground, before a crowd of 4,100.

Notable events
Two key rule changes were made nationally in 1939.
The holding the ball rule was altered to eliminate the provision for a player to drop the ball when tackled, meaning that a player was forced to either kick or handpass the ball when tackled to avoid conceding a free kick.
The boundary throw-in was reintroduced whenever the ball went out of bounds, except when put out deliberately, instead of a free kick being awarded against the last player to touch the ball, as had been the case since 1925.
 A record 91 scores of more than one hundred points were kicked during the year; this was a record until 1969.
 Hawthorn's win over Carlton in Round 5 was its first as a member of the VFL.  Carlton had won the first 25 meetings.
 All round 18 matches were postponed for a week because all grounds were under water from constant rain.
 North Melbourne's win over Geelong in Round 18 was the club's first since their initial meeting in Round 1 of the 1925 VFL season, North Melbourne's first match as a member of the VFL, breaking a streak of 23 consecutive wins by Geelong.

Footnotes

References
 Maplestone, M., Flying Higher: History of the Essendon Football Club 1872–1996, Essendon Football Club, (Melbourne), 1996. 
 Rogers, S. & Brown, A., Every Game Ever Played: VFL/AFL Results 1897–1997 (Sixth Edition), Viking Books, (Ringwood), 1998. 
 Ross, J. (ed), 100 Years of Australian Football 1897–1996: The Complete Story of the AFL, All the Big Stories, All the Great Pictures, All the Champions, Every AFL Season Reported, Viking, (Ringwood), 1996.

External links
 1939 Season - AFL Tables

Australian Football League seasons
Vfl season